René-Gaston Baco de La Chapelle (28 April 1751, Nantes – 29 November 1800, Guadeloupe) was a French lawyer and politician, deputy for Loire-Inférieure from 1789 to 1791 and mayor of Nantes in 1792–1793, making him notable for his actions during the Vendéen attack of June 1793.

Life

Honours
A marble bust of himself, made by Amédée Ménard is next to the Nantes City Hall

See also
The French Revolution by Jules Michelet
Pierre-Mathurin Gillet
War in the Vendée
Mayor of Nantes

Bibliography
Alexandre Perthuis and Stéphane de La Nicollière-Teijeiro, Le Livre doré de l’hôtel-de-ville de Nantes, Volume II, Imprimerie Grinsard, 1873, pages 32–35. (English:* Alexandre Perthuis and Stéphane de La Nicolliere-Teijeiro, The Golden Book of the City Hall of Nantes, Volume II, Imprimerie Grinsard, 1873, pages 32–35.)

1751 births
1800 deaths
Members of the National Constituent Assembly (France)
Members of the Council of Five Hundred
Mayors of Nantes